J. Owen Forrester (April 27, 1939 – July 1, 2014) was a United States district judge of the United States District Court for the Northern District of Georgia.

Education and early career

Born in Columbus, Georgia, Forrester received a Bachelor of Science degree from Georgia Institute of Technology in 1961 and a Bachelor of Laws from Emory University School of Law in 1966. He was staff attorney for the Callaway for Governor Committee in Georgia from 1966 to 1967. He was in private practice in Atlanta, Georgia from 1967 to 1969, and was then an Assistant United States Attorney for the Northern District of Georgia until 1976.

Federal judicial service

Forrester served as a United States Magistrate for the Northern District of Georgia from 1976 to 1981. On November 24, 1981, he was nominated by President Ronald Reagan to a seat on the United States District Court for the Northern District of Georgia vacated by Judge Newell Edenfield. Forrester was confirmed by the United States Senate on December 9, 1981, and received his commission the following day. He assumed senior status on April 27, 2004, serving in that status until his death on July 1, 2014 in Atlanta.

Notable case

Forrester decided McCleskey v. Zant, 580 F. Supp. 338 (N.D. Ga. 1984), later reviewed sub nomine McCleskey v. Kemp by the Supreme Court, in which he found David C. Baldus' study on racial disparities and the death penalty to be methodologically flawed.

References

External links
 

1939 births
2014 deaths
Judges of the United States District Court for the Northern District of Georgia
United States district court judges appointed by Ronald Reagan
20th-century American judges
Georgia Tech alumni
Emory University School of Law alumni
Assistant United States Attorneys
United States magistrate judges